Ca’ Corner della Regina can refer to the following palaces:

Palazzo Corner della Regina on the Grand Canal in Venice
Ca’ Corner della Regina, Vedelago, Province of Treviso